The men's discus throw event at the 1998 Commonwealth Games was held on 17 September in Kuala Lumpur.

Results

References

Discus
1998